Abdul Samad  It may be roughly translated as "servant of the Self-sufficient Master" or "servant of the Eternal Refuge".

Because the letter s is a sun letter, the letter l of the al- is assimilated to it. Thus although the name is written with letters corresponding to Abd al-Samad, the usual pronunciation corresponds to Abd as-Samad. Alternative transliterations include Abdus Samad and others, all subject to variant spacing and hyphenation.

It may refer to:

People with the name
Abdul-Samad Esfahani (or Abdussamad Esfahani) (died 1299), Sufi saint
Khwaja Abdus Samad/Abd al-Samad etc. (16th century), Persian and the Mughal miniature painter
Abdul Samad of Selangor (1804–1898), Sultan of Selangor
Abdol-samad Mirza Ezz ed-Dowleh Saloor (1843–1929), Persian prince
Abdul Samad Khan Achakzai (1907–1973), Pashtun nationalist leader
Abdus Samad Azad (1922–2005), Bangladeshi politician
Abdul Samad Ismail (1924–2008), aka Pak Samad, Malaysian  journalist, writer  and editor
A. K. A. Abdul Samad (1926–1999), Indian politician
Abdul Basit 'Abd us-Samad (1927–1988), Kurdish-Egyptian Qari
A. Samad Said (born 1935), Malaysian poet
Abdul Samad (guitarist) (born 1938), American R&B guitarist, usually known as Billy Davis
Khabibullo Abdusamatov (born 1940), Uzbek-Russian astrophysicist
Shahrir Abdul Samad (born 1949), Malaysian politician
Adnan Zahid Abdulsamad (born 1950), Kuwaiti politician
Khalid Abdul Samad (born 1957), Malaysian politician
M. P. Abdussamad Samadani (born 1959), Indian politician
Ahmed Abdel Samad (born 1972), Egyptian  boxer
Abdulsamad, surname of all members of The Boys (American band) (born 1973 - 1979)
Abdool Samad (born 1979) Guyanese-Canadian cricketer
Abdul Samad Rohani (ca. 1982 - 2008), Afghan journalist
Abdelouahad Abdessamad (born 1982), Moroccan footballer
Abdessamad Chahiri (born 1982), Moroccan footballer
Abdessamad Rafik (born 1982), Moroccan footballer
Shariff Abdul Samat (born 1984), Singaporean footballer
Abdul Samad (detainee), Afghan detainee in Guantanamo
Abdul Samad Khaksar (died 2006), Afghan politician
Abdolsamad Khorramshahi, Iranian lawyer
Ako Abdul-Samad, American politician
Abdul Samad Siddiqui, Indian educationist
Datuk Abdul Samad Hj. Alias, Malaysian accountant
Bashir Abdel Samad, Egyptian footballer
Abdul Samad (Indian cricketer), Indian cricketer
Abdul Samad (Pakistani cricketer), Pakistani cricketer
Sahal Abdul Samad (born 1997), Indian professional footballer

See also
Abd (Arabic)
Samad (disambiguation)

References

Arabic masculine given names
Arabic-language surnames